The 2018 ITTF-Oceania Cup was a table tennis event that took place from 18–19 May in Port Vila, Vanuatu. The event was organised by ITTF-Oceania, under the authority of the International Table Tennis Federation (ITTF). It was the 10th edition of the event, and the first time that it had been held in Vanuatu. Men's singles and women's singles competitions were held, and the winner of each event qualified automatically for the 2018 Men's and Women's World Cups.

The eighth edition of the Pacific Cup was also held during the event, with players from Australia and New Zealand excluded from competing.

Medallists

Players

Qualification was based primarily on a points list, with a maximum of two players per association being invited to compete in both the men's and women's singles competitions.

Men's singles

 David Powell
 Hu Heming
 Yoshua Shing
 Geoffrey Loi
 Philip Wing
 Vicky Wu
 Dean Shu
 Matthew Ball

Women's singles

 Jian Fang Lay
 Melissa Tapper
 Sally Yee
 Grace Yee
 Cheng Zhiying
 Natalie Paterson
 Ornella Bouteille
 Stephanie Qwea

Men's singles

Group stage

Knockout stage

Women's singles

Group stage

Knockout stage

Pacific Cup

Men

Women

See also

2018 Oceania Table Tennis Championships
2018 Europe Top 16 Cup
2018 ITTF-ATTU Asian Cup
2018 ITTF Pan-America Cup

References

External links

ITTF-Oceania website

ITTF-Oceania Cup
Oceania Cup
Oceania Cup
Oceania Cup
Table tennis competitions in Vanuatu
International sports competitions hosted by Vanuatu
Oceania Cup